Alyson "Aly" Rae Eckmann (born November 8, 1990) is an American journalist, singer, television and radio host.

Early life
Eckmann was born in Winthrop, Washington on November 8, 1990, although at the age of eighteen, she moved to Mexico and later, at the age of twenty, she moved to Madrid, Spain. Initially, Eckmann would stay for about ten months, although after finding work as a babysitter she stayed for two more years. After this, Eckmann went on vacation to the Canary Islands where she found the recording of the television program Un príncipe para Corina, with which according to her: "I happened to stumble upon Corina's program, and without really knowing how, I ended up on TV." A casting director actually proposed the idea of participating in Cuatro's dating show. At first she was reluctant to it but finally accepted.

Career

Television
After this, Eckmann signed for the television program Hable con ellas for the television channel Telecinco, where she became a presenter for the first time, and also works as a reporter. On the other hand, Eckmann also works as an announcer in the radio program No te cortes, from Los 40 Principales.

On October 22, 2014, she started as a reporter for the program Todo va bien de Cuatro. In April 2015, Eckmann made an appearance in the television series La que se avecina, where she starred as Megan Simons, Trevor's wife, Judith's ex-partner. Since 2014, Alyson has collaborated with Vevo Spain presenting the Vevo Fresh program and the DCODE festivals.

In 2015, Eckmann joined Non Stop People, a Movistar+ channel run by and for young people to present the Xtraǃ program. On 29 September 2016, she participated in the game show Sígueme el Rollo on Ten. On 9 January 2017, she became one of the contestants on the Telecinco reality show Gran Hermano VIP 5. She won the 100,000 euros prize with 58.8% of the audience in her favor.

Music
Eckmann was the vocalist of a jazz group for 8 years. Later, she composed two singles, one in 2014, called "Believe Me" and another in 2015 titled "Day After Day." She has also participated in various musicals such as Cats, Seussical and Annie.

In 2016, she went to the Antena 3 musical program Tu cara me suena. At the end of that same year, Eckmann collaborated as a vocalist in "Get Over It", a song by Les Castizos that came out to the sold under the music label Clipper's Sounds.

Filmography

References

External links

1990 births
Living people
People from Seattle
American expatriates in Spain
American television hosts
American radio hosts
American women singers
American women journalists
American women television presenters
21st-century American women